Feridun Cemal Erkin (1899–1980) was a Turkish diplomat and politician. He was the minister of foreign affairs between 1962 and 1965. He served as the ambassador of Turkey in various countries, including Italy, the United States of America, Spain, France and the United Kingdom.

Early life and education
Erkin was born in İstanbul 1899. He graduated from Galatasaray High School in 1920. He received a degree in law from the University of Paris in 1925. Between 1916 and 1918 he completed the military service.

Career

Erkin worked as a deputy accountant in İstanbul public administration in 1920. He was the chief secretary of the population exchange commission in 1926. He was appointed to his first diplomatic post in 1928 as the first secretary in the Turkish embassy in London. After serving at the Turkish Ministry of Foreign Affairs in various capacities he was named as the envoy extraordinary in the Turkish embassy in Berlin 1934. Erkin became consul general in Berlin in 1938. During World War II he headed a commission of the Republic of Turkey which was formed to assist Greece when it was attacked by the Nazi forces and was the undersecretary of the Ministry of Foreign Affairs.

He was appointed ambassador of Turkey to Italy in 1947. He served in the post for one year and was named as the ambassador of Turkey to the United States in 1948. Erkin's tenure ended in 1955 when he was appointed as ambassador of Turkey to Spain. Next he was named as the ambassador of Turkey to France in 1957 which he held until 1960. He served as the ambassador of Turkey to the United Kingdom between 1960 and 1962. 

Erkin was appointed minister of foreign affairs on 1 April 1962, replacing Selim Sarper in the post. Erkin was in office until 20 February 1965. He served in the cabinets led by Prime Minister İsmet İnönü. Then he was elected as a deputy from the Republican People's Party representing Ordu. He left the party and joined the Justice Party. In 1970 Erkin was elected as senator.

Death
Erkin died 21 June 1980.

Work and legacy
In 1968 Erkin published a book, Türk Sovyet İlişkileri ve Boğazlar Meselesi, (Turkish: Turkey Soviet Union Relations and the Straits Question). His memoir was published by the Turkish Historical Society in 1994 with the title Dışişlerinde 34 Yıl: Anılar-Yorumlar (Turkish: 34 Years at the Ministry of Foreign Affairs: Memories–comments).

Awards
Erkin was awarded by Greece the Order of the Phoenix due to his activities as the head of Turkish aid commission during World War II.

References

External links

WorldCat Identities

20th-century Turkish writers
1899 births
1980 deaths
Cold War diplomats
Galatasaray High School alumni
Ministers of Foreign Affairs of Turkey
Politicians from Istanbul
Republican People's Party (Turkey) politicians
Members of the 13th Parliament of Turkey
University of Paris alumni
Members of the 26th government of Turkey
Deputies of Ordu
Ambassadors of Turkey to Italy
Ambassadors of Turkey to Spain
Ambassadors of Turkey to the United Kingdom
Ambassadors of Turkey to the United States
Members of the 27th government of Turkey
Members of the 28th government of Turkey
Justice Party (Turkey) politicians
Members of the Senate of the Republic (Turkey)
Recipients of the Order of the Phoenix (Greece)
20th-century Turkish diplomats